Nopphitam is a district (amphoe) of Nakhon Si Thammarat province, southern Thailand.

History
The district was created on 1 April 1995 by splitting off the four western tambons from Tha Sala district.

On 15 May 2007, all 81 minor districts were upgraded to full districts. On 24 August, the upgrade became official.

Geography
Neighboring districts are (from the northeast clockwise): Sichon, Tha Sala, Phrom Khiri and Phipun of Nakhon Si Thammarat Province and Ban Na San and Kanchanadit of Surat Thani province.

Nopphitam contains the northernmost part of the Khao Luang National Park, protecting a large part of the Nakhon Si Thammarat mountain range.

Administration
The district is divided into four sub-districts (tambons), which are further subdivided into 38 villages (mubans). There are no municipal (thesaban) areas, and four tambon administrative organizations (TAO).

References

External links
amphoe.com

Districts of Nakhon Si Thammarat province